Mi Macro Periférico is the second BRT line in the Guadalajara metropolitan area. It runs on  along the Anillo Periférico Manuel Gómez Morin from its crossing with the Artesanos Avenue until the Solidaridad Iberoamericana Avenue, commonly known as Carretera a Chapala (Road to Chapala). It has a total of 42 stations between Carretera a Chapala and Barranca de Huentitán. The line has connections with line 1 and line 3 of the Guadalajara light rail system, lines 1 and 4 of SITREN and Mi Macro Calzada.

History 
The idea entered planning stage, and in 2015 it was formalised, stating that it would have 97 stations on which around 182 buses, 12 metres long, would service. It was expected to have a demand of  daily passengers, the operation would be joint between SITEUR and the Alianza de Camioneros de Jalisco.

The complexity of the project caused the construction and operation plans to be delayed, and in 2016 it was speculated that the project would not be taken further during Sandoval's administration due to a lack of budget. That same year the initial project was cut, by tracing a route between the Belisario Domínguez Avenue and Carretera a Chapala, thus the project only got as far as  instead of the initial . Even then, Sandoval's intention stood, assuring that it would move 370 thousand daily passengers. Due to budget, construction, and infrastructure issues, the project was paralysed.

In February 2019, the state government headed by Enrique Alfaro Ramírez inserted in the state budget an entry for 200 million pesos to begin the repaving works of Periférico with the objective to retake the works of the Peribús, using as a base the 41.5 kilometres trace proposed in 2016. In November 2019, the works for the first stage of the transport system started, which by the time got renamed to Mi Macro Periférico, said project was inaugurated on January 30, 2022, by the state governor. The system has connections with the lines 1 and 3 of the light rail, the line 1 of Mi Macro and the lines 1, 1B and 4 of SITREN.

Routes 
To decongest the main trunk (T01) two more trunks were made, the second trunk (T02) departs from the northern terminal (Barranca de Huentitán) until Chapalita Inn, the third trunk (T03) departs from the former station until the southern terminal (Carretera a Chapala). The line also has three complementary routes, which enter the stations and on certain sections leave the confined lane to service on nearby colonies as normal buses. Thanks to the trunks and complementaries system, the system is able to handle a minimum headway of 3 minutes, as mentioned by the head of SITEUR. This line will not have an Express service like the first line.

Trunk 01

Trunk 02

Trunk 03

Complementaries 
For the complementary routes dual-units are used, just like those that currently run in the Express route of Mi Macro Calzada. This is to allow transfers from street-level to station-level and vice versa without leaving the unit and without needing to pay again.

Feeder routes 

The route C98 of Mi Transporte Eléctrico also functions as a feeder route of Mi Macro Periférico, since, like the other feeder routes, when boarding from/to route the payment system also makes a 50% discount. This route runs all over the north, east, and new east Anillo Periférico, with two destinations: the University Centre of Tonalá, in the municipality of the same name, and the Guadalajara International Airport, located on Carretera a Chapala in the municipality of Tlajomulco de Zúñiga.

See also

References 

Mi Macro
2022 establishments in Mexico